Krzyż Wielkopolski  ( (Ostbahn)) is a town in Poland, with 6,176 inhabitants (2019) in the Czarnków-Trzcianka County, Greater Poland Voivodeship. It is an important railroad junction, with two major lines crossing there - the Berlin-Bydgoszcz and the Poznań-Szczecin connections.

History 
From 1847 to 1848 the line of the Stargard-Posen Railway Company was built through the area. In 1848, the construction of a train station began at the planned junction of the Küstrin-Posen line, with a reception building built in the classical style. The town owes its existence to the rail, as developed only after 1848, when the Poznań-Szczecin line was opened, crossing the Prussian Eastern Railway. In fact its name (Krzyż and Kreuz in English mean cross) reflects the fact that rail lines cross there.

Although the construction of the Prussian Eastern Railway was only finally approved by the Prussian state parliament at the end of 1849, the railway station Kreuz with the south-west-north-east orientation of its tracks was laid out on a route from Berlin to the lower Vistula and to East Prussia. The construction of the Prussian Eastern Railway began in 1849 from the aforementioned station and was completed in 1851 via Piła to Bydgoszcz. Further sections of the last 740 km route followed until the opening of the last section from the Berlin to Gusow in 1857.

After further railway lines to Wałcz and Rogoźno had been built from this point in the following years, the station had gained such importance that a new settlement developed in its vicinity. A Protestant church was built in 1882 and the market square was completed in 1900. The good rail connections prompted several industrial companies such as a starch factory and wood processing companies to setup in the area. The population had increased from 430 in 1880 to 2,400 in 1910.

Until 1887, Kreuz belonged to the Czarnikau district in the Province of Posen and after its bifurcation, to the Filehne district until 1920. It remained part of Germany in the interwar period, but was located only 2 km from the new border with Poland. Kreuz became part of the newly formed Province of Posen-West Prussia and was located in the Netzekreis district. It was incorporated as a town in 1936. In 1938, with the dissolution of the province of Posen-West Prussia, Kreuz was incorporated into the Province of Pomerania.

Towards the end of World War II, the Red Army occupied the region and 85% of the town was destroyed. After the war, the town became part of Poland.

References

Cities and towns in Greater Poland Voivodeship
Czarnków-Trzcianka County